Pamplona/Iruña railway station (Pamplona in Spanish, Iruña in Basque and Pamplona/Iruña officially) is the central railway station of Pamplona/Iruña in Navarre, Spain. Commonly referred locally as the RENFE station or Sanduzelai station, the station is part of the Adif and high-speed rail systems.

References 

Railway stations in Navarre
Pamplona